Final Account may refer to:

 Final Account (film), 2020 documentary about Nazi Germany
 Dry Bones That Dream, also known as Final Account, 1994 crime novel by Peter Robinson

See also
 Final accounts